Club Deportivo Tuilla is a Spanish football team based in Tuilla, a small village in the municipality of Langreo, in the autonomous community of Asturias. Founded in 1952, it plays in Tercera División RFEF – Group 2, holding home matches at Estadio El Candín, which has a capacity of 2,800 spectators. 

After winning the 2010 FIFA World Cup in South Africa and the 2011 UEFA Champions League Final, International footballer David Villa, who was born in Tuilla and enjoyed individual success with Sporting de Gijón, Real Zaragoza, Valencia CF, FC Barcelona, Atlético Madrid, and Spain, waved a CD Tuilla scarf at the crowd.

History
In 2007, Tuilla won the regional stage of the Copa Federación by the first time and reached the semi-finals in the 2007–08 National stage, after beating Laguna, Lemona and San Sebastián de los Reyes, before being eliminated by Ourense due to the away goals rule.

Tuilla repeated the Regional success in 2011 and 2012, but in both editions was eliminated in the Round of 32 of the National stage.

In the 2012–13 season, Tuilla finished as champion of the Asturian group of Tercera División, but failed in its third attempt of promoting to Segunda División B.

In 2013, Tuilla played for the first time in its history the Copa del Rey. In the first round, the team beat CD Tropezón by 0–1 in the overtime, in a game where Tuilla finished with nine players. Tuilla was eliminated in the second round by Burgos CF which won at El Candín by 0–3. In the 2017-18 season the club finished 7th in the Tercera División, Group 2. 

In May 2019 Julio Llanos was appointed manager of the club.

Season to season

24 seasons in Tercera División
1 season in Tercera División RFEF

Honours
Tercera División: 2012–13
Copa RFEF (Asturias tournament): (3) 2007, 2011, 2012

Famous managers
 Abelardo Fernández
 Ricardo Bango

References

External links
Official website 
Futbolme team profile 

Football clubs in Asturias
Association football clubs established in 1952
Langreo
1952 establishments in Spain